Farmers Bank Building may refer to:

Farmers Bank Building (Leslie, Arkansas), listed on the NRHP in Arkansas
Farmers Bank Building (Norborne, Missouri), listed on the NRHP in Missouri
 Farmers Bank Building (Pittsburgh, Pennsylvania), a former skyscraper